The northern redbelly snake (Storeria occipitomaculata occipitomaculata) is a nonvenomous snake in the family Colubridae, a subspecies of Storeria occipitomaculata. It is sometimes referred to as a fire snake. It is endemic, North America and  The Caribbean in some parts in  Jamaica, and Saskatchewan to Nova Scotia in the north and south to Florida and Texas.

Description
Adults and young have known dorsal colorations of solid olive-brown, tan-brown, chestnut-brown, grey-brown, grey or even black. They have three yellow spots posterior to the head shields, to which the specific name occipitomaculata (meaning spotted back of the head) refers. The underside is coral-red to brick-red. Coloration is usually made up of three different shades forming a striped pattern. Like all species of the genus Storeria, redbelly snakes have keeled scales and no loreal scale. Some specimens have been found with three black dots on the top of the head.

Habitat
They live in moist flowerbeds, gardens, and moist woodlands, such as borders between a forest and a wetland. They often rest under logs and rocks near a woods or forest.

Diet
They feed primarily on slugs and earthworms.

Reproduction
The northern redbelly snake gives birth to live young.

In captivity
They are known to live up to 4 years in captivity. Being nonvenomous, they can be safely held.

References

External links
 Description from Nova Scotia Museum
 Storeria occipitomaculata at The Reptile Database

Further reading
Behler JL, King FW. 1979. The Audubon Society Field Guide to North American Reptiles and Amphibians. New York: Knopf. 743 pp. . (Storeria occipitomaculata, pp. 655–656 + Plates 501, 505–506).
Conant R. 1975. A Field Guide to Reptiles and Amphibians of Eastern and Central North America, Second Edition. Boston: Houghton Mifflin. xviii + 429 pp.  (hardcover);  (paperback). (Storeria occipitomaculata, p. 156 + Plate 22 + Map 127).
Conant R, Bridges W. 1939. What Snake Is That?: A Field Guide to the Snakes of the United States East of the Rocky Mountains. New York and London: D. Appleton-Century. Frontispiece map + 163 pp. + Plates A-C, 1–32. ("Storeria occipito-maculata", pp. 110–111 + Plate 21, Figure 61).
Morris PA. 1948. Boy's Book of Snakes: How to Recognize and Understand Them. A volume of the Humanizing Science Series, edited by Jaques Cattell. New York: Ronald Press. viii + 185 pp. ("The Red-Bellied Snake", Storeria o. occipitomaculata, pp. 28–29, 180).
Smith HM, Brodie ED Jr. 1982. Reptiles of North America: A Guide to Field Identification. New York: Golden Press. 240 pp. . (Storeria occipitomaculata, pp. 160–161). 
Storer, DH. 1839. Reports on the Fishes, Reptiles and Birds of Massachusetts. Boston: Commissioners on the Zoological and Botanical Survey of the State. xii + 426 pp. ("C[oluber]. occipito-maculatus", new species, p. 230).
Wright AH, Wright AA. 1957. Handbook of Snakes of the United States and Canada. Ithaca and London: Comstock. 1,105 pp. (in 2 volumes). (Storeria o. occipitomaculata, pp. 714–721 + Figure 210 + Map 54).
Zim HS, Smith HM. 1956. Reptiles and Amphibians: A Guide to Familiar American Species: A Golden Nature Guide. Revised edition. New York: Simon and Schuster. 160 pp. ("Red-bellied Snake", Storeria occipitomaculata, pp. 106, 156).

Storeria
Fauna of the Plains-Midwest (United States)
Reptiles of the United States
Reptiles described in 1839